Levi Stephen (born 19 March 1974, also known as Levi Smith) is a Scottish former professional and semi-professional footballer who played as a midfielder.

Career
After signing professionally with Rangers, Stephen played in the Scottish Football League for Clydebank and semi-professionally for Montrose. After playing junior football with Bon Accord and Highland League football with Buckie Thistle and Deveronvale, Stephen played in Australia for the Sutherland Sharks and the Stanmore Hawks, before returning to Scotland in 2000 to play with Huntly and winning the league.

Sexual abuse revelations

In April 2017, a BBC Scotland programme Football Abuse: The Ugly Side of the Beautiful Game, featured claims from Stephen about an alleged sexual abuse perpetrator.

References

1974 births
Living people
Scottish footballers
Rangers F.C. players
Clydebank F.C. (1965) players
Montrose F.C. players
Buckie Thistle F.C. players
Deveronvale F.C. players
Huntly F.C. players
Scottish Football League players
Sutherland Sharks FC players
Scottish expatriate footballers
Expatriate soccer players in Australia
Association football midfielders
Scottish expatriate sportspeople in Australia